Julien Guiomar (3 May 1928 in Morlaix, Finistère, Brittany – 22 November 2010 in Agen, Lot-et-Garonne, Aquitaine), was a French film actor.

The actor had retired to the Dordogne at Monpazier. The person who incarnated Colonel Vincent in "Papy fait de la resistance", Jacques Tricatel in "L'Aile ou la cuisse," who had donned the police colonel's uniform in "Z", of Costa-Gavras, Who died at the age of 82 from heart disease in the night of 21–22 November at the Saint-Hilaire clinic where he had been hospitalized.

The man, born in Morlaix, was also very fond of the south-west.
"It was an exceptional being, simple, a very easy approach," says an Agenais of the world of the spectacle who had participated in a show organized for the 80 years of the comedian in Dordogne Périgord.

Filmography

 Le Roi de cœur (King of Hearts) (directed by Philippe de Broca) (1966) as Monseigneur Marguerite
 Le Voleur (The Thief of Paris) (directed by Louis Malle) (1967) as L'abbé Félix La Margelle
 All Mad About Him (directed by Norbert Carbonnaux) (1967) as Antoine Bascou
 La Louve solitaire (directed by Édouard Logereau) (1968) as Durieux
 Pour un amour lointain (directed by Edmond Séchan) (1968) as Maxime
 Ballade pour un chien (directed by Gérard Vergez) (1969) as Robin
 Z (directed by Costa-Gavras) (1969) as Le colonel de gendarmerie
 La Voie lactée (The Milky Way) (directed by Luis Buñuel) (1969) as Le curé espagnol / Spanish priest
 L'Auvergnat et l'autobus (directed by Guy Lefranc) (1969) as Me Valentin Chanterive
 La Fiancée du pirate (directed by Nelly Kaplan) (1969) as Le Duc
 La Horse (directed by Pierre Granier-Deferre) (1970) as Le commissaire
 Borsalino (directed by Jacques Deray) (1970) asSimon Boccace
 L'Étrangleur (directed by Paul Vecchiali) (1970) as L'inspecteur Simon Dangret
 Les Mariés de l'an II (directed by Jean-Paul Rappeneau) (1971) as Le représentant du peuple
 Doucement les basses (directed by Jacques Deray) (1971) as Francisco
 La violenza: quinto potere (directed by Florestano Vancini) (1972) as Commissario Golino
 State of Siege (directed by Costa-Gavras) (1972) Carlos Ducas (voice, uncredited)
 La Raison du plus fou (directed by Raymond Devos and François Reichenbach) (1973) as Le patron du restaurant
 Décembre (directed by Mohammed Lakhdar-Hamina) (1973) as Le général Beaumont
 La Proprietà non è più un furto (directed by Elio Petri) (1973) as Bank Director
 L'Histoire très bonne et très joyeuse de Colinot trousse-chemise (The Edifying and Joyous Story of Colinot) (directed by Nina Companeez) (1973) as Le mari de Rosemonde
 Une baleine qui avait mal aux dents (directed by Jacques Bral) (1974) as Julien
 Tendre Dracula (directed by Pierre Grunstein) (1974) as Le producteur
 Dites-le avec des fleurs (directed by Pierre Grimblat) (1974) as Le docteur Comolli
 La Moutarde me monte au nez (directed by Claude Zidi) (1974) as Albert Renaudin
 Bons baisers... à lundi (directed by Michel Audiard) (1974) as Maurice Poudevigne - le mari cocu d'Esmeralda
 Aloïse (directed by Liliane de Kermadec) (1975) as Le directeur du théâtre
 Section spéciale (Special Section) (directed by Costa-Gavras) (1975) as Le substitut général Tétaud
 Souvenirs d'en France (directed by André Téchiné) (1975) as Victor Pedret
 L'Incorrigible (directed by Philippe de Broca) (1975) as Camille
 Adieu poulet (The French Detective) (directed by Pierre Granier-Deferre) (1975) as Le contrôleur général Ledoux
 À cause de l'homme à la voiture blanche (directed by Jean Rougeul) (1975)
 Mado (directed by Claude Sautet) (1976) as Lépidon
 L'Aile ou la cuisse (directed by Claude Zidi) (1976) as Jacques Tricatel
 Barocco (directed by André Téchiné) (1976) as Gauthier
 L'Animal (directed by Claude Zidi) (1977) as Fechner
 Mort d'un pourri (directed by Georges Lautner) (1977) as Fondari
 La Zizanie (directed by Claude Zidi) (1978) as Le docteur Landry
 Ils sont fous ces sorciers (directed by Georges Lautner) (1978) as Stumph-Bachelier, le président
 Les Ringards (directed by Robert Pouret) (1978) as Jeannot Bidart, dit "La presse"
 Je vous ferai aimer la vie (directed by Serge Korber) (1979) as Dr. Pierre Soltier
 Caro papà (directed by Dino Risi) (1979) as Parrella
  (directed by Nicos Perakis) (1979) as Louis
 Sono fotogenico (directed by Dino Risi) (1980) as Carlo Simoni
 Le Bar du téléphone (directed by Claude Barrois) (1980) as Antoine Bini
 Inspecteur la Bavure (directed by Claude Zidi) (1980) as Le commissaire-divisionnaire Vermillot
 Est-ce bien raisonnable ? (directed by Georges Lautner) (1981) as Raymond Volfoni
 Un chien dans un jeu de quilles (directed by Bernard Guillou) (1983) as Alexandre
 Équateur (directed by Serge Gainsbourg) (1983) as Bouilloux
 Papy fait de la résistance (directed by Jean-Marie Poiré) (1983) as Le colonel Vincent
 Carmen (directed by Francesco Rosi) (1984) as Lillas Pastia
 Les Ripoux (My New Partner) (directed by Claude Zidi) (1984) as Commissaire Bloret
 L'Arbre sous la mer (directed by Philippe Muyl) (1985) as Thomas
 The Alley Cat (Le Matou) (directed by Jean Beaudin) (1985) as Aurélien Picquot
 Le Débutant (directed by Daniel Janneau) (1986) as Lucien Berger
 Jubiabá (directed by Nelson Pereira dos Santos) (1986) as Luigi
 Dernier été à Tanger (directed by Alexandre Arcady) (1987) as Le commissaire Gomez, un flic aux ordres
 Flag (directed by Jacques Santi) (1987) as Léon Terzakian
 Les Deux crocodiles (directed by Joël Séria) (1987) asJulien Derouineau
 Terre sacrée (directed by Emilio Pacull) (1988) as Le père
  (directed by Peter F. Bringmann) (1989) as Girolles
 Astérix et le coup du menhir (directed by Philippe Grimond) (1989) as Le devin Prolix (voice)
 Lucifer et l'horloger (directed by Luc Lefebvre) (1989, Short)
 Plein fer (directed by Josée Dayan) (1990) asFabiani
 Robinson et compagnie (directed by Jacques Colombat) (1991) as Bougainville (voice)
 Léolo (directed by Jean-Claude Lauzon) (1992) as Grandfather
 Je m'appelle Victor (directed by Guy Jacques) (1993) as Emile
 Violetta la reine de la moto (directed by Guy Jacques) (1997) as Corneille
 Que la lumière soit (directed by Arthur Joffé) (1998) as Dieu le père
 Un peu de retenue ! (directed by Sylvain Gillet) (1999, Short)
 J'ai faim !!! (directed by Florence Quentin) (2001) as Guyomard, l'oncle de Lily
 Reptil (directed by Pascal Stervinou) (2003, Short) as Emile Picard
 Clandestino (directed by Paule Muxel) (2003) as Jean

References

External links
 

1928 births
2010 deaths
People from Morlaix
French male film actors
Place of death missing